Gmina Janów Podlaski is a rural gmina (administrative district) in Biała Podlaska County, Lublin Voivodeship, in eastern Poland, on the border with Belarus.

The gmina contains part of the protected area called Podlasie Bug Gorge Landscape Park.

Villages
Gmina Janów Podlaski contains the villages and settlements of Błonie, Bubel-Granna, Bubel-Łukowiska, Jakówki, Janów Podlaski, Kajetanka, Klonownica Mała, Klonownica-Plac, Nowy Pawłów, Ostrów, Peredyło, Polinów, Romanów, Stare Buczyce, Stary Bubel, Stary Pawłów, Werchliś, Woroblin and Wygoda.

Neighbouring gminas
Gmina Janów Podlaski is bordered by the gminas of Biała Podlaska, Konstantynów, Leśna Podlaska and Rokitno. It also borders Belarus.

References

External links
Polish official population figures 2006

Janow Podlaski
Biała Podlaska County